Dynamite Boy is the fourth studio album by pop punk band Dynamite Boy. Released 2004, it was also their last album before the band's three-year breakup from 2005 to 2008.

Track listing
"Suspended Animation"
"Satellite"
"Man of the Year"
"Photograph"
"Promise"
"Harmonic"
"Zap"
"Waiting for Erin"
"Sky's the Limit"
"Bring the Rock"
"Accepted"
"Long Since Forgotten"

References

2004 albums
Dynamite Boy albums
Fearless Records albums